A spork is a hybrid form of cutlery taking the form of a spoon-like shallow scoop with two to four fork-like tines. Spork-like utensils, such as the terrapin fork or ice cream fork, have been manufactured since the late 19th century; patents for spork-like designs date back to at least 1874. Sporks are commonly used by fast food restaurants, schools, prisons, militaries, backpackers, and airlines.

The word spork is a portmanteau of spoon and fork. It appeared in the 1909 supplement to the Century Dictionary, where it was described as a trade name and "a 'portmanteau-word' applied to a long, slender spoon having, at the end of the bowl, projections resembling the tines of a fork".   The word "spork" was later registered as a trademark in the US and the UK.

History

In the US, patents for sporks and proto-sporks have been issued. A combined spoon, fork, and knife closely resembling the modern spork was invented by Samuel W. Francis and issued  on February 3, 1874. Many of these inventions predated the use of the term "spork". Given this significant prior art, the basic concept of combining aspects of a spoon and fork is well established; more modern patents have limited themselves to the specific implementation and appearance of the spork. These design patents do not prevent anyone from designing and manufacturing a different version of a spork. Examples of modern US design patents for sporks include patent number D247,153 issued in February 1978 and patent D388,664 issued in January 1998.

Etymology 
The word "spork" originated in the early 20th century to describe such devices. In 1951, Hyde W. Ballard of Westtown, Pennsylvania filed an application with the United States Patent Office (USPO; now the United States Patent and Trademark Office) to register "Spork" as a trademark for a combination spoon and fork made of stainless steel. The Van Brode Milling Company subsequently registered SPORK for a combination plastic spoon, fork and knife at the USPO on October 27, 1970, but the registration expired 20 years later.  The word Spork accompanied by a stylised design is registered in the US in relation to hand tools, in the name of a UK-based individual.

In the UK, Plastico Limited registered Spork as a trademark in relation to cutlery with effect from September 18, 1975 (reg. no. 1052291, now expired). The trademark is also registered in the UK in relation to gardening tools in the name of the same UK based individual who owns US trademark registration no. 2514381. Another British company, Lifeventure, sells titanium and plastic versions using the name "Forkspoon".

In an unsuccessful lawsuit in 1999 where the company Regalzone sought to invalidate Plastico Limited's UK registration for Spork, Justice Neuberger wrote:

Materials and uses

Materials such as stainless steel, silver, aluminum, titanium,copper and polycarbonate plastic have been used in spork manufacturing. Plastic sporks are common in prisons in the United States because they are difficult to form into shiv-type weapons to attack other inmates. Prepackaged meals may come with a disposable plastic spork. Sporks are also frequently used by backpackers, Boy Scouts and other outdoorspeople as they are a lightweight and space-saving alternative to carrying both a fork and spoon.

In popular culture 
The Disney/Pixar animated movie Toy Story 4 introduces a character named Forky, an animated spork voiced by Tony Hale.

See also

  
  
  (spoon-fork in Finnish)

References

 D. Green & Co. (Stoke Newington) Ltd. and Plastico Ltd. v Regalzone Ltd. [2002] ETMR 241 (CA)

External links

 The Straight Dope on sporks 
 The spork’s weird history, Bee Wilson, Salon

American inventions
Eating utensils
Forks
Portmanteaus
Spoons